Erik Anders Eriksson (born 21 July 1982) is a Swedish curler.

Teams

Personal life
Anders Eriksson is from a family of Swedish curlers: one of his brothers is well-known curler Oskar Eriksson, who curls third for Team Niklas Edin, five-time World Champion; another of his brothers is curler Markus Eriksson, 2014 World Men's silver medallist.

References

External links
 

Living people
1982 births
Swedish male curlers
Swedish curling champions